An airport lounge is a facility operated at many airports. Airport lounges offer, for selected passengers, comforts beyond those afforded in the airport terminal itself, such as more comfortable seating, quieter environments, and often better access to customer service representatives.  Other accommodations may include private meeting rooms, telephones, wireless internet access and other business services, along with provisions to enhance passenger comfort, such as free drinks, snacks, magazines, and showers.

The American Airlines Admirals Club was the first airport lounge when it opened at New York City's La Guardia Airport, in 1939. Then AA president C. R. Smith conceived it as a promotional tool.

Types

Airline lounges

Airlines operate airline lounges as a service to premium passengers, usually passengers flying first class and business class, with high level frequent flyer status, and premium travel credit card memberships.

Most major carriers have one or more lounges in their hubs and focus cities as well as in the major airports they serve. The major US airlines—American (Admirals Club), Delta (Delta Sky Club), and United (United Club)—operate dozens of lounges, while smaller airlines like Alaska Airlines (Alaska Lounge) tend to only operate a handful of lounges in their hub and focus cities.

Airlines outside of Australia and North America generally do not sell lounge memberships, and instead reserve lounge access exclusively for very frequent flyers and passengers in premium cabins. However, a passenger who has a lounge membership in an airline in one of the three major airline alliances (Oneworld, SkyTeam, or Star Alliance) may have access to the lounges of the other members of that alliance. For example, Qantas Club membership provides access to the Admirals Club lounges due to a reciprocal arrangement with American Airlines; similarly, a member of the United Club or other Star Alliance members can access lounges of Air Canada and Air New Zealand.

It is, however, not uncommon for non-alliance members to agree individually to allow usage of each other's lounges. For example, although Alaska Airlines operates just nine Alaska Lounges, its members have access to American Airlines Admirals Club (and vice versa). Alaska Lounge members cannot, however, access the lounges of other Oneworld members, such as British Airways or Japan Airlines.

Several credit card companies offer their own branded lounges accessible to certain cardholders. American Express operates Centurion Lounges in the United States as well as HKG. JPMorgan Chase and Capital One have announced plans to open their own lounges for cardholders.

Pay-per-use lounges
Private companies, such as Airport Dimensions by Collinson Group, Aspire Lounges by Swissport, Plaza Premium Lounge, and Global Lounge Network, also operate generic pay-per-use lounges. In contrast to airline lounges, these facilities are open to any traveller traversing the airport, regardless of class of ticket or airline, subject to payment of a fee. Most only offer day passes, but some also offer yearly and lifetime memberships. Access to the lounges can be booked via online platforms such as LoungeBuddy or, in limited cases, one-day passes can be purchased directly at the lounge entrance.

First class airline lounges

For many airlines, a first class lounge will also be offered to international first class and top-tier passengers. First class lounges are usually more exclusive and will feature extra amenities over business class that are more in line with the European/Asian concept of an airport lounge. In the few cases where an amenity is offered only in the business class lounge, first class passengers are permitted to use the business lounge if they wish.  In any case, anyone with first class lounge access almost automatically has access to the business class lounge—such as if a traveling companion is not in first class and cannot be brought into the first class lounge as a guest. In most cases, airlines will offer first class passengers a free pass to their standard airport club. Some airlines offer "arrival lounges" for passengers to shower, rest, and eat after a long-haul international flight.

Access to lounges 

Access to airport lounges may be obtained in several ways. In Australia, Canada, and the United States, a common method to gain access is by purchasing an annual or a lifetime membership, while in Asia and Europe this is usually impossible. Membership fees are sometimes discounted for elite members of an airline's frequent flyer program and may often be paid using miles. Certain high-end credit cards associated with an airline or lounge network, such as the Chase Sapphire Reserve, Delta Reserve, and United MileagePlus Club credit cards, include membership to Priority Pass and associated lounge access for as long as one owns the card.

Lounge access can also be attained with an airline status card, which is common in Europe. The top frequent-flyer levels often offer access to any of an airline's lounges or partner airlines' lounges, when traveling in any class of travel on any of the partner airlines (usually it is required for the cardholder to be booked on one of the carrier's flights within the next 24 hours). Most airlines also usually offer free lounge access to anyone in their premium cabins (first class or business class) on their days of travel; in North America this is usually only available to passengers on intercontinental or transcontinental flights.

Pay-per-use lounges can be accessed by anyone, irrespective of airline or flight class. Some offer further benefits when booking directly with them rather than through a reseller.

Independent programs, such as Collinson's Priority Pass, offer access to selected airline lounges for an annual fee, while Go Simply, Holiday Extras, LoungePass, and some offerings by independent and airline lounge programs offer pay per use and/or prebookable access without need for membership. Premium credit and charge cards such as Diners Club International, and the American Express Platinum and Centurion Card charge cards offer lounge programs for members. Some banks, like ABN Amro and HSBC, offer lounge access for premium clients. American Express also offers access to lounges belonging to Priority Pass and is expanding its own line of lounges.

Amenities 

Besides offering more comfortable seating, lounges usually provide complimentary alcoholic and non-alcoholic beverages, and light snacks such as fruit, cheese, soup, pastries and breakfast items. In the United States and Canada, nearly all domestic lounges offer an open bar for domestic beer, house wine and well liquor. In the United States, premium beverages such as imported beer, top-shelf liquor, high end wines and champagne are often available for purchase. In U.S. states where open bars are prohibited by law, non-premium beverages may be sold at a token rate (e.g. $1 per drink).

Other amenities typically include flight information monitors, televisions, newspapers, and magazines, plus business centers with desks, internet workstations, telephones, photocopiers and fax services. Complimentary wireless Internet access for patrons is also common.

In Asia, Europe and the Middle East, lounges (especially those for first class passengers) can be quite luxurious, offering an extensive premium open bar, full hot and cold buffet meals, cigar rooms, spa and massage services, fitness centers, private cabanas, nap suites and showers.

Some lounges have pool tables as amenities. Additionally, there are wireless charging stations in lounges, at some airports in London, installed by Nokia.

Lounges in other modes of transport
Facilities similar to airport lounges can be found in large train stations (such as Amtrak's ClubAcela lounges or the DB Lounge), mainly for first-class inter-city rail or night train passengers.

References 

Lounge
Rooms